The Twin Falls metropolitan statistical area (MSA), as defined by the United States Census Bureau, is an area consisting of two counties in the Magic Valley region of Idaho, anchored by the city of Twin Falls.

As of the 2010 census, the MSA had a population of 99,604. According to 2016 estimates, the population grew 6.93% to 106,508.

Counties
Twin Falls
Jerome

Communities
Places with more than 30,000 inhabitants
Twin Falls (Principal City)
Places with 10,000 to 30,000 inhabitants
Jerome
Places with 1,000 to 10,000 inhabitants
Buhl
Filer
Kimberly
Places with 500 to 1,000 inhabitants
Hazelton
Hansen
Places with less than 500 inhabitants
Castleford
Eden
Hollister
Murtaugh
Unincorporated places
Rogerson

Demographics
As of the census of 2000, there were 82,626 people, 30,151 households, and 21,764 families residing within the USA. The racial makeup of the USA was 91.25% White, 0.20% African American, 0.71% Native American, 0.65% Asian, 0.08% Pacific Islander, 5.11% from other races, and 2.00% from two or more races. Hispanic or Latino of any race were 1.11% of the population.

The median income for a household in the USA was $34,601, and the median income for a family was $39,485. Males had a median income of $29,047 versus $20,510 for females. The per capita income for the USA was $16,104.

See also
Idaho census statistical areas

References

 
Metropolitan areas of Idaho